Jalāl Mujarrad Kunyāʾī, popularly known as Shah Jalal, was a celebrated Sufi figure of Bengal. His name is often associated with the Conquest of Sylhet and the Spread of Islam into the region, part of a long history of interactions between the Middle East, Central Asia, and South Asia. Various complexes and religious places have been named after him, including the largest airport in Bangladesh, Hazrat Shahjalal International Airport.

Birthplace and origin

Jalal was said to have been born on May 25, 1271. Various traditions and historical documents differ in his place of birth, and there is a gap of two centuries between the life of the saint and literature which attempted to identify his origin. Local ballads and devotees continue to refer to him as Shah Jalal Yemeni, connecting him to Greater Yemen. An inscription from circa 1505 AD, during the reign of Sultan Alauddin Husain Shah, refers to Shah Jalal with the suffix Kunyāʾī. Towards the end of this century, in 1571, Shah Jalal's biography was recorded in Shaikh ʿAli Sher Bangālī's Sharḥ Nuzhat al-Arwāḥ (Commentary on the excursion of the souls). The author was a descendant of one of Shah Jalal's senior companions, Nūr al-Hudā, and his account was also used by his teacher Muḥammad Ghawth Shattārī in his Gulzar-i-Abrār of 1613. According to this account, Shah Jalal was a Turkestan-born Bengali and a spiritual disciple of Ahmad Yasawi. Muḥammad Nāṣiruddīn Ḥaydar composed a full biography of Shah Jalal titled Suhayl-i-Yaman Tārīkh-i-Jalālī in 1859, which referred to him as Yemeni. Although this was composed 5 centuries after Jalal's death, Haydar's work consulted two now-lost manuscripts; Risālah (Message) by Muḥīuddīn Khādim from 1711 and Rawḍah as-Salāṭīn (Garden of the Sultans) from 1721.

A number of scholars have claimed that the suffix from the Husain Shahi inscription refers to the city of Qūniyah (Konya) in modern-day Turkey (then in the Sultanate of Rum), and they stated further that Jalal may have possibly moved to Yemen in his later life. Others have linked the suffix to the village of Kaninah in Yemen's Hadhramaut region, and some even to Kenya in East Africa.

Early life and education
His mother, Syeda Haseenah Fatimah, and his father, Sayyid Mahmud ibn Muhammad ibn Ibrahim, were descendants of the Quraysh tribe in Makkah. His mother was the daughter of Jalaluddin Surkh-Posh Bukhari. Jalal's father was a cleric and contemporary of the Sufi mystic Rumi and died five years after his son's birth. Jalal was educated and raised by his maternal uncle, Syed Ahmad Kabir Suhrawardi. in Makkah. He excelled in his studies; became a hafiz and mastered fiqh. He became a makhdoom, teacher of Sunnah and, for performing prayers in solitary milieu and leading a secluded life as an ascetic, al Mujarrad was post-fixed to his name. It is claimed he achieved spiritual perfection (Kamaliyyat) after 30 years of study, practice and meditation.

Travel to South Asia
Jalal's maternal uncle, Syed Ahmad Kabir, gave him a handful of soil and asked him to travel to the Indian subcontinent. He instructed him to choose to settle and spread Dawah in any place in India where the soil exactly matches that which he gave him in smell and colour. Shah Jalal journeyed eastward from Makkah and met many great scholars and Sufi mystics. Sheikh Ali of Yemen gave up his duty as a prince to join Jalal on his expedition. Many people joined Jalal from the Arabian peninsula including his nephew Shah Paran. Jalal also came across Sheikh Chashni Pir, a pedologist who would check the soil of the places that Shah Jalal would visit in order to find the matching soil given by Sheikh Ahmad Kabir. Jalal passed through Baghdad and was present there during the time of the murder of the last Abbasid caliph Al-Musta'sim in 1258. Driven off by the Mongol invasion of Baghdad, they continued journeying to the east. 

Jalal reached Uch in the Punjab, where he and many of his companions were initiated into the Sufi order of Suhrawardiyya. Jalal was joined by many other disciples throughout his journey. He passed through Delhi where he was made a guest of the Sufi saint Nizamuddin Auliya. Nizamuddin offered him a gift of two rare pigeons which would later be called Jalali Kobutor (Pigeons of Jalal). It is said that these pigeons continue to breed and its descendants remain around Jalal's dargah.

Conquest of Sylhet

In 1303, Sultan Shamsuddin Firoz Shah of Lakhnauti was engaged in a war with the neighbouring Gour Kingdom in the Sylhet region, then under the rule of the Hindu king Gour Govinda. This began when Shaykh Burhanuddin, a Muslim living in Sylhet, sacrificed a cow for his newborn son's aqiqah (birth celebration). Govinda, in a fury for what he saw as sacrilege, had the newborn killed as well as having Burhanuddin's right hand cut off.

When word of this reached Sultan Firoz Shah, an army commanded by his nephew, Sikandar Khan and later his Sipah Salar (Commander-in-chief) Syed Nasiruddin, was sent against Gour. Three successive strikes were attempted, all ending in failure due to the Bengali armies inexperience in the foreign terrain as well as Govinda's superior military strategy.

A fourth attack, now with the aid of Shah Jalal and his companions (at this point numbering 360) was undertaken. Jalal may have been summoned by Firoz Shah for aid after the initial failed attacks against Gour Govinda. Alternatively, he may already have been present in Sylhet, fighting against the Hindu king independently prior to being approached by the Sultan. The combined Muslim forces ultimately claimed victory against Gour. Govinda was forced to retreat and Sylhet was brought under Muslim control. According to tradition, Shah Chashni Pir at this point compared the soil in Sylhet with that which was previously given to Jalal by his uncle, finding them to be identical. In any case, following the battle, Jalal and his followers settled in Sylhet.

A Persian inscription from 1303 has since been discovered in Jalal's dargah. It mentioned Sikandar's victory in Arsah Srihat with the aid of the saint during the reign of Firoz Shah. This inscription can now be found in Bangladesh National Museum.

Later life

During the later stages of his life, Jalal devoted himself to propagating Islam. The famous traveller Ibn Battuta, then in Satgaon, made a one-month journey through the mountains of Kamarupa, north-east of Sylhet, to meet him. On his way to Sylhet via Habung, Ibn Battuta was greeted by several of Jalal's disciples who had come to assist him on his journey many days before he had arrived. At the meeting in 1345, Ibn Battuta noted that Shah Jalal was tall and lean, fair in complexion and lived by the mosque in a cave, where his only item of value was a goat he kept for milk, butter, and yogurt. He observed that the companions of the Shah Jalal were foreign and known for their strength and bravery. He also mentions that many people would visit Jalal to seek guidance. The meeting between Ibn Battuta and Shah Jalal is described in his Arabic travelogue, Rihla (The Journey).

Even today in Hadramaut, Yemen, Jalal's name is established in folklore.

The exact date of his death is debated, but he is reported by Ibn Battuta to have died on 20 Dhul Qa'dah 746 AH (15 March 1346 CE). He was buried in Sylhet in his dargah (tomb), which is located in a neighbourhood now known as Dargah Mahalla. Whether or not he has descendents is debated. He appointed his closest companion, Haji Muhammad Yusuf to be the khadim (guardian) of his dargah and Yusuf's descendants, the Sareqaum family, continue to have this role.

His shrine is famous in Sylhet and throughout Bangladesh, with hundreds of both Muslim and Hindu devotees visiting daily. According to Bipin Chandra Pal, the Sadhus believe that Shah Jalal was an incarnation of Mahadeva. He is buried next to four of his companions. The ex-Prince of Yemen, Shahzada Sheikh Ali to his south, Haji Yusuf to his east and Haji Khalil and Haji Dariya both to his west. The largest mosque in Sylhet was built at the Dargah (also one of the largest in Bangladesh).

Spiritual genealogy 

Spiritual genealogy of Shah Jalal is as follows:

 Prophet Muhammad
 Ali ibn Abi Talib
 Hasan al-Basri
 Habib al-Ajami
 Dawud Tai
 Maruf Karkhi
 Sari al-Saqati
 Mumshad Al-Dinawari
 Ahmad Aswad Dinnuri
 Abu Muhammad Amwiya
 Azi Uddin Suhrawardi
 Abu al-Najib Suhrawardi
 Shihab ad-Din Suhrawardi
 Baha-ud-din Zakariya
 Jalaluddin Surkh-Posh Bukhari
 Ahmad Kabir Suhrawardi
 Shah Jalal

Eponyms
 Jalalabad, a historical name of Sylhet
 Jalalabad Ragib-Rabeya Medical College, private medical school
 Jalalabad Cantonment, Bangladesh Army military quarter
 Jalalabad Cantonment Public School and College
 Shahjalal Fertiliser Factory, Bangladesh's largest fertiliser factory, located in Fenchuganj
 Shah Jalal High School, secondary school in Jagannathpur
 Hazrat Shahjalal International Airport, Bangladeshi airport in Dhaka; nation's largest international gateway
 Shahjalal Islami Bank Limited, private commercial bank
 Shah Jalal Mosque & Islamic Cultural Centre, grade II listed mosque located in Cardiff, United Kingdom
 Shahjalal University of Science and Technology, Bangladeshi public university located in Sylhet
 Shahjalal Uposhahar, a neighbourhood in Ward 22, Sylhet
 Shahjalal Hall, University of Chittagong

Companions

Syed Nasiruddin, army commander of Shamsuddin Firuz Shah (Chowkidekhi, Sylhet)
Haydar Ghazi, second wazir of Sylhet (Sonargaon)
Haji Yusuf, remained with Shah Jalal in Chowkidighi
Ghazi Burhanuddin, first Muslim of Sylhet (Tultikar/Burhanabad, Ward 24)
Shah Paran, his nephew (Khadimnagar, Sylhet Sadar)
Aziz Chishti (Nij Gohorpur, Balaganj)
Adam Khaki (Deorail, Badarpur)
Syed Yaqub (Horipur, Barlekha)
Shah Malum (Rajonpur, Fenchuganj)
Shah Halimuddin (Kanihati, Kulaura)
Shah Mustafa (Moulvibazar)
Shah Gabru (Gabhurteki, Osmani Nagar)
Shah Siddiq (Panchpara, Osmani Nagar)
Khanda Jhokmok (Rainagar, Ward 19/20)
Fateh Ghazi (Fatehpur-Shahjibazar, Madhabpur)
Pir Gorachand (Haroa, North 24 Parganas, West Bengal)
Later companions:
Shah Kamal Quhafa (Shaharpara, Jagannathpur)
Shah Tajuddin (Lama Tajpur, Osmani Nagar)
Shah Ruknuddin (Kadamhata, Rajnagar)

See also
 Muhammad bin Bakhtiyar Khalji
 Moinuddin Chishti
 Sikandar Khan Ghazi
 Nizamuddin Auliya, his spiritual friend also gave him two pairs of black pigeons, later named Jalali kobutor
 Syed Nasiruddin

References

Further reading

Sharḥ Nuzhat al-Arwāḥby 'Ali Sher Bangali (1571)
Gulzar-i-Abrār by Muhammad Ghawthi Shattari (1613)
Suhail-i-Yaman by Nasir ad-Din Haydar (1860)
Risālat by Muhiy ad-Din Khadim (1711)
Rauzat-us-Salatin (1721)

Hadhrami people
1271 births
1346 deaths
People from Sylhet
14th-century Indian Muslims
Bengali Sufi saints
Indian people of Turkic descent
Indian people of Arab descent
14th-century Bengalis
13th-century Bengalis